Berta E. Baker (November 27, 1875 – May 4, 1964) was a North Dakota public servant and politician with the Republican Party who became known for being the first woman to serve in two of the state's statewide offices. Baker served as the first female North Dakota State Treasurer from 1929 to 1932, and as the first female North Dakota State Auditor from 1935 to 1956.

Biography
Berta Baker was born near Sterling, Illinois in 1875, and received her early education there. After finishing her education, she taught school in the state of Illinois for five years, and married Bert F. Baker, a man who would become a state Senator in the 1920s. The Bakers moved to North Dakota in the spring of 1907 and settled on a farm in Renville County. After serving three years in the Senate, Mr. Baker died at age 57. Ms. Baker continued to raise her four children, and secured a job in Bismarck. She was elected as the North Dakota State Treasurer in 1928, and was the first female in the position. She for four years; the maximum allowed by term limitation. Two years later, she sought the office of North Dakota State Auditor, and won. She served in that capacity until 1956 when she retired at age 81. Baker died in Minot, North Dakota at the age of 88 in 1964.

Notes

1875 births
1964 deaths
North Dakota State Auditors
State treasurers of North Dakota
Women in North Dakota politics
People from Sterling, Illinois
20th-century American politicians
20th-century American women politicians